Glen St. Mary is a town in Baker County, Florida, United States. In 2010, the population recorded by the U.S. Census Bureau was 437.

Geography
Glen St. Mary is located at  (30.275987, –82.161408).

U.S. Route 90 (Mount Vernon Avenue) runs through the center of town, and Interstate 10 passes through south of the town, with access from Exit 333 (Baker County Road 125).

Climate

Demographics

At the 2000 census, there were 473 people, 181 households and 131 families residing in the town. The racial makeup of the town was 97.89% White, 0.63% African American, 0.42% Native American, 0.63% Asian, and 0.42% from two or more races. Hispanic or Latino of any race were 1.90% of the population.

There were 181 households, of which 45.9% had children under the age of 18 living with them, 54.1% were married couples living together, 16.51% had a female householder with no husband present, and 27.1% were non-families. 24.9% of all households were made up of individuals, and 11.6% had someone living alone who was 65 years of age or older. The average household size was 2.61 and the average family size was 3.2.

30.4% of the population were under the age of 18, 9.9% from 18 to 24, 25.8% from 25 to 44, 23.5% from 45 to 64, and 10.4% who were 65 years of age or older. The median age was 32 years. For every 100 females, there were 90.0 males. For every 100 females age 18 and over, there were 85.9 males.

The median household income was $28,906 and the median family income was $29,833. Males had a median income of $23,182 and females $20,625. The per capita income was $12,954. About 14.5% of families and 12.7% of the population were below the poverty line, including 28.7% of those under age 18 and 12.8% of those age 65 or over.

Education
Baker County High School is located on 1 Wildcat Drive in Glen St. Mary.

References

External links
 Glen St. Mary, Florida. Official website. Accessed March 13, 2007.

Towns in Baker County, Florida
Towns in the Jacksonville metropolitan area
Towns in Florida